Tonny Kristine Ahm (f. Olsen) (21 September 1914 – 7 April 1993) was a female badminton player from Denmark.

She won 26 Danish National Championships between 1935 and 1957. She won eleven events at the prestigious All-England Championships, all but one of them after reaching the age of thirty. In her early forties she played singles for Denmark in the first Uber Cup (women's world team championship) series, and helped her team to a second-place finish.

Ahm was included in the Badminton Hall of Fame in 1997.

Major achievements

References
Notes

General

ChinaBadminton: Tonny Ahm (丹麦)

External links
Tonny Ahm's Profile - Badminton.dk

1914 births
1993 deaths
Danish female badminton players
Indian national badminton champions
20th-century Danish women